University Bridge may refer to:
 University Bridge (Saskatoon), Saskatchewan, Canada
 University Bridge (Seattle), Washington, United States of America
 University Bridge (St. Cloud), Minnesota, United States of America
 University Heights Bridge, crosses the Harlem River, connecting West 207th Street in the Inwood neighborhood of Manhattan to West Fordham Road in the University Heights section of the Bronx
 University Avenue Bridge, crosses the Schuylkill River in Philadelphia, Pennsylvania